is a Japanese sweet snack food produced by the Ezaki Glico food company. Pocky was first sold in 1966, and was invented by Yoshiaki Koma. It consists of coated biscuit sticks. It was named after the Japanese onomatopoeic word , which is supposed to resemble the sound of the snack being cracked.

The original chocolate-coated Pocky was followed by an almond-coated variant in 1971, and a strawberry coating in 1977. Today, the product line includes variations in the flavored coatings, such as milk, mousse, green tea, honey, banana, cookies and cream, strawberry and coconut, and themed products such as "Decorer Pocky", with colorful decorative stripes in the coating, and "Men's Pocky", a "mature"  dark (bittersweet) chocolate version.

World distribution

Pocky is a very popular treat in Japan, especially among teenagers. In bars, it is sometimes served with a glass of ice water or milk.
 It also has a significant presence in other Asian countries, such as China, South Korea, Thailand, Indonesia, the Philippines, Laos, Malaysia, Singapore, Hong Kong, Taiwan, India, Burma, Brunei and Vietnam. In Malaysia, Pocky was sold under the name "Rocky" for five decades. It was rebranded under the name "Pocky" in 2014, along with a new package design and slogan. Commercials  featuring Malaysian singer Yuna, also began to air in 2015 in order to give brand recognition and a sales boost.

In Europe, Pocky is produced under license by Mondelēz International and sold under the name "Mikado" in Austria, Belgium, France, Germany, Greece, Italy, Ireland, Luxembourg, Spain, Switzerland, the Netherlands and the United Kingdom. "Mikado" can be found at most supermarkets and many international food stores.

In the United States and Canada, Pocky can be found in Asian supermarkets and the international section of most large supermarkets; such retailers include World Market, H-E-B, Wegmans, Kroger, Jungle Jim's International Market, Costco, Walmart (in the Asian foods aisle), some Target stores, some Walgreens, Meijer, Fiesta, and anime convention dealers' rooms. In the United States, Pocky is marketed both by LU (in chocolate and peanut butter flavors), and by Ezaki Glico's American division, Ezaki Glico USA Corporation (in chocolate and strawberry flavors).

In Australia and New Zealand, it is usually sold in Asian convenience markets, along with other Asian foods and products. Like the United States and Canada these are also widely available in the international sections on the Asian food aisles of most supermarket chains. Specialty importers also exist in Australia and New Zealand.

In Turkey, Pocky is produced by Ülker and Şölen, under Biskrem Bi'stik and Biscolata Stix name.

Flavors and variations

Pocky can be found in dozens of varieties such as chocolate, strawberry, and almond. Some of the more unusual flavors include the seasonal flavors of honey (spring) and kiwifruit mango (summer). The bittersweet version of chocolate Pocky is known as Men's Pocky. Regional flavors of Pocky include grape (Nagano), yūbari melon (Hokkaidō), giant mikan (tangerine, sold in the Kyūshū region), powdered tea azuki bean (Kyoto), Kobe wine (Kobe), and five-fusion berry (Goka). Also, flavors such as banana, lychee, coffee, caramel, marble royal milk tea, melon, Daim bar (sold in the UK), milk, honey and milk, cream cheese, berry, sweet potato, coconut, crush (crunchy cracker pieces in chocolate), corn on the cob, pineapple, pumpkin, kurogoma (black sesame), kinako (soybean flour), marron, Brazilian pudding, cherry, tomato, orange, mikan, blueberry, apple yogurt, hazelnut, mixed berry and green tea are available.

The latest flavors are special editions, 2 two-tone flavors in a larger box than chocolate or strawberry Pocky provides ( Special Editions: 2.47 oz. [70 g], Normal Pocky: 1.41 oz. [40 g]). The 2 newest flavors are cookies and cream and banana chocolate. Both have brown biscuit sticks (in the chocolate banana Pocky case, the biscuit is the chocolate and banana cream.) The cookies and cream consists of blended chocolate biscuit cookies with a slight chocolaty flavor of the biscuit.

Special variations of Pocky include Decorer Pocky (which features extra decorative icing) and Mousse Pocky (which features extra-thick, "creamy" mousse-like icing and is more exclusive). Unlike other Pocky variations, Mousse Pocky packages contain only nine per pack, fewer pieces than regular Pocky.

Dessert Pocky features Pocky sticks covered in a generous helping of cream. These flavors include Double Chocolate, Tiramisu, Chocolate Banana, Marron White, Chestnut, Strawberry Shortcake, and Orange. Dessert Pocky usually comes with five packets in a box with three in each sleeve.

Other variations include Pocky G (marketed as being "hard and rich"), Giant Pocky (strawberry- and chocolate-flavored; each box contains 20 individually wrapped sticks with real dried strawberry; each stick is about 10" long, and about three times the diameter of a normal Pocky stick), Giant Dream Pocky (box of 20 individually wrapped 10" sticks; each stick is in one of the five featured flavors of melon, grape, green tea, strawberry or standard chocolate), Sakura Pocky (limited edition that is part of the Luxury Chocolatier sub-group; each stick is coated with pink cherry blossom essenced chocolate sprinkled with a bit of salt), Reverse Pocky (cracker on the outside with the filling in the middle), Fortune-Telling Pocky (each stick contains a "fortune"), and Pocky Cake (a literal cake shaped to look like a Pocky stick. Each cake contains, according to its packaging, raisins, chocolate cream, orange peel, and an Italian cake batter).

A recent Limited Edition Pocky is called Otona no Kohaku or "Adult Amber" Pocky, which is bitter chocolate slightly salted, and meant to be used as an aperitif paired with whiskey. These are sold in a cylindrical canister containing six packages.

A related product is Pretz, which is an unglazed version of Pocky, featuring flavors like tomato, pizza, and salad, as well as sweet flavors such as cocoa and French toast.

Glico Morinaga case

In 1984, following threats by the Monster with 21 Faces to poison Glico confections and the resulting mass withdrawal of Glico products from shelves, a man wearing a Yomiuri Giants baseball cap was caught placing Glico chocolate on a store shelf by a security camera. This man was believed to be the mastermind behind the Monster with 21 Faces. The security camera photo was made public after this incident.

Melamine contamination

On September 30, 2008, Hong Kong authorities announced that melamine had been detected in Pocky Men's coffee cream-coated biscuit sticks made in China. Ezaki Glico had no immediate comment on the reported contamination.  The melamine contamination level was found to be 43 ppm (the legal limit is 2.5 ppm). On October 17, 2008, Pocky Men's coffee cream-coated biscuit sticks were banned in Sri Lanka by the country's health ministry alongside 59 other products containing melamine.

See also
 Pocky & Pretz Day
 Glico Morinaga case
 Konpa
 Pepero
 Pretzel sticks
 Pretzels
 List of Japanese snacks
 Cadbury Fingers
 Toppo
 Yan Yan (snack)

References

External links

 Official website 
 Glico website 

1966 introductions
Japanese snack food
Japanese confectionery
Japanese brand foods
Japanese brands